Angelo Trezzini (28 April 1827, Milan - 27 May 1904, Milan) was an Italian painter.

Biography
Enrolled at the Brera Academy of Fine Arts from 1844 to 1846, Trezzini served his pictorial apprenticeship in the studio of the Induno brothers, under the guidance of Domenico, his brother-in-law, and in close contact with Gerolamo, his comrade in arms in the First Italian War of Independence.

In order to escape the Austrian army during the riots in Milan (1848), he took refuge with his grandparents in Astano, Switzerland, where he welcomed the Indunos, who had also fled. In 1859, he fought with the Hunters of the Alps, led by Giuseppe Garibaldi. In 1861, he won the Mylius Prize for genre painting.

He then focused on military subjects and established himself as a painter of battle scenes in the 1860s. The following decade saw the introduction of anecdotal themes of a patriotic character, treated in a domestic and sentimental style, reflecting the models developed by the Induno brothers, the constant point of reference for all his work as a painter.

He obtained a teaching post at a professional training school for young women in Milan in 1876 and was commissioned by various charitable institutions to paint portraits of their benefactors. A lithographer and illustrator, he also drew satirical cartoons for humorous journals.

References
 Elena Lissoni, Angelo Trezzini, online catalogue Artgate by Fondazione Cariplo, 2010, CC BY-SA (source for the first revision of this article).

External links

19th-century Italian painters
Italian male painters
20th-century Italian painters
Painters from Milan
Brera Academy alumni
1827 births
1904 deaths
19th-century Italian male artists
20th-century Italian male artists